Médanos is a town in Buenos Aires Province, Argentina. The town hosts the "Fiesta Nacional del Ajo" (National Garlic Festival) and is located in the Buenos Aires wines area. It is the administrative seat of Villarino Partido.

External links

 Municipal website 

Populated places in Buenos Aires Province
Populated places established in 1832
Wine regions of Argentina